Gabriel Alejandro "Gaby" Deck (born February 8, 1995) is an Argentine professional basketball player for Real Madrid of the Liga ACB and EuroLeague. At a height of 1.98 m (6'6"), he can play at both the small forward and power forward positions.

Early career
In August 2011, Deck attended the Basketball Without Borders camp held in Rio de Janeiro, Brazil. He was named the camp's most valuable player. He later played at the Nike Hoops Summit in 2013.

Professional career

Quimsa (2010–2016) 
Deck started his professional career with the Argentinian LNB club Quimsa.

San Lorenzo (2016–2018)
In 2016, Deck joined the Argentine club San Lorenzo. With San Lorenzo, he won the 2018 FIBA Americas League championship while also being named the league's Grand Final MVP. Deck was also the competition's top scorer, with a scoring average of 19.1 points per game, over eight games played.

Real Madrid (2018–2021)
On July 19, 2018, Deck signed a three-year deal with Real Madrid of the Liga ACB and EuroLeague after he reached a buyout agreement with San Lorenzo. In his first season with the club, he made a debut in the 2018–19 EuroLeague season, averaging 4.4 points and 2.4 rebounds over 31 games. He averaged 4.8 points and 2.9 rebounds in the Spanish League over 30 games.

In his last season, Deck appeared in 58 games, averaging 9.7 points, 3.8 rebounds, and 1.2 assists in 23.9 minutes while shooting 52.1 percent from the field.

Oklahoma City Thunder (2021–2022)
On April 12, 2021, Deck signed a multi-year contract with the Oklahoma City Thunder of the NBA. On April 29, Deck made his debut against the New Orleans Pelicans, scoring two points, grabbing two rebounds and dishing out two assists across 15 minutes in the Thunder's 109–95 loss.

On January 4, 2022, Deck was waived by the Thunder.

Return to Real Madrid (2022–present)
On January 19, 2022, Deck returned to Real Madrid, signing a two-year deal.

National team career

Junior national team
With the junior national team of Argentina, Deck was the top scorer of the 2012 FIBA Under-17 World Cup, with an average of 21.5 points per game. He was selected to the All-Tournament Team. He also played at the 2013 FIBA Under-19 World Cup.

Senior national team
Deck also represented the senior men's Argentine national basketball team at the 2015 FIBA AmeriCup, in Mexico City, where he won a silver medal. He recorded his team's best two-point field goal percentage during the tournament. He also played at the 2016 Summer Olympics and at the 2017 FIBA AmeriCup.

In 2019, he participated in the team that won the Pan American gold medal in Lima.

In 2022, Deck won the gold medal in the 2022 FIBA AmeriCup held in Recife, Brazil. He was Argentina´s starting power forward in the tournament. After the final game against Brazil, he was named in the All-Tournament Team and declared the MVP of the championship.

Career statistics

NBA

|-
| style="text-align:left;"| 
| style="text-align:left;"| Oklahoma City
| 10 || 0 || 21.2 || .478 || .133 || .818 || 4.0 || 2.4 || .8 || .0 || 8.4
|-
| style="text-align:left;"| 
| style="text-align:left;"| Oklahoma City
| 7 || 0 || 8.0 || .571 || .500 || — || .9 || .7 || .1 || .0 || 2.6
|- class="sortbottom"
| style="text-align:center;" colspan="2"| Career
| 17 || 0 || 15.8 || .494 || .211 || .818 || 2.7 || 1.7 || .5 || .0 || 6.0

EuroLeague
 
|-
| style="text-align:left;" rowspan=5| Real Madrid
| style="text-align:left;"| 2018–19
| 31 || 11 || 14.4 || .595 || .333 || .698 || 2.4|| 0.7 || 0.2 || .0 || 4.4 || 5.4
|-
| style="text-align:left;"| 2019–20
| 24 || 17 || 20.04 || .464|| .259 || .82 || 3.2 || 1.5 || 0.3|| 0.1 || 7.4 || 8.9
|-
| style="text-align:left;"| 2020–21
| 32 || 22 || 24.06 || .487 || .407 || .843 || 3.7 || 1.2 || 0.7 || .0 || 8.8 || 10.3
|-

References

External links
 Gabriel Deck at acb.com 
 Gabriel Deck at draftexpress.com
 Gabriel Deck at eurobasket.com
 Gabriel Deck at euroleague.net
 Gabriel Deck at fiba.com
 

1995 births
Living people
2019 FIBA Basketball World Cup players
Argentine expatriate basketball people in Spain
Argentine expatriate basketball people in the United States
Argentine men's basketball players
Argentine people of German descent
Basketball players at the 2016 Summer Olympics
Basketball players at the 2019 Pan American Games
Basketball players at the 2020 Summer Olympics
Liga ACB players
Medalists at the 2019 Pan American Games
National Basketball Association players from Argentina
Oklahoma City Thunder players
Olympic basketball players of Argentina
Pan American Games gold medalists for Argentina
Pan American Games medalists in basketball
Power forwards (basketball)
Quimsa basketball players
Real Madrid Baloncesto players
San Lorenzo de Almagro (basketball) players
Small forwards
Sportspeople from Avellaneda
Undrafted National Basketball Association players